These are the Official Charts Company's UK Indie Chart number-one albums of 2008.

Chart history

See also
List of number-one albums of 2008 (UK)
List of UK Dance Albums Chart number ones of 2008
List of UK Independent Singles Chart number ones of 2008
List of UK Rock Chart number-one albums of 2008
List of UK R&B Albums Chart number ones of 2008

References

External links
Independent Albums Chart at the Official Charts Company
UK Top 40 Indie Album Chart at BBC Radio 1

Number-one indie albums
United Kingdom Indie Albums
2008